In the seven-layer OSI model of computer networking, the network layer is layer 3. The network layer is responsible for packet forwarding including routing through intermediate routers.

Functions
The network layer provides the means of transferring variable-length network packets from a source to a destination host via one or more networks. Within the service layering semantics of the OSI network architecture, the network layer responds to service requests from the transport layer and issues service requests to the data link layer.

Functions of the network layer include:
 Connectionless communication
 For example, IP is connectionless, in that a data packet can travel from a sender to a recipient without the recipient having to send an acknowledgement. Connection-oriented protocols exist at other, higher layers of the OSI model.
 Host addressing
Every host in the network must have a unique address that determines where it is. This address is normally assigned from a hierarchical system.  For example, you can be :

"Fred Murphy"                                                    to people in your house, 
"Fred Murphy, 1 Main Street"                             to Dubliners,
"Fred Murphy, 1 Main Street, Dublin"                 to people in Ireland, 
"Fred Murphy, 1 Main Street, Dublin, Ireland"    to people anywhere in the world. 

On the Internet, addresses are known as IP addresses (Internet Protocol).

 Message forwarding
Since many networks are partitioned into subnetworks and connect to other networks for wide-area communications, networks use specialized hosts, called gateways or routers, to forward packets between networks.

Relation to TCP/IP model
The TCP/IP model  describes the protocols used by the Internet. The TCP/IP model has a layer called the Internet layer, located above the link layer. In many textbooks and other secondary references, the TCP/IP Internet layer is equated with the OSI network layer. However, this comparison is misleading, as the allowed characteristics of protocols (e.g., whether they are connection-oriented or connection-less) placed into these layers are different in the two models. The TCP/IP Internet layer is in fact only a subset of functionality of the network layer. It describes only one type of network architecture, the Internet.

Protocols
The following are examples of protocols operating at the network layer.

 CLNS, Connectionless-mode Network Service
 DDP, Datagram Delivery Protocol
 EGP, Exterior Gateway Protocol
 EIGRP, Enhanced Interior Gateway Routing Protocol
 ICMP, Internet Control Message Protocol
 IGMP, Internet Group Management Protocol
 IPsec, Internet Protocol Security
 IPv4/IPv6, Internet Protocol
 IPX, Internetwork Packet Exchange
 LLARP, Low Latency Anonymous Routing Protocol 
 OSPF, Open Shortest Path First
 PIM, Protocol Independent Multicast
 RIP, Routing Information Protocol

References

External links
 OSI Reference Model—The ISO Model of Architecture for Open Systems Interconnection, Hubert Zimmermann, IEEE Transactions on Communications, vol. 28, no. 4, April 1980, pp. 425 – 432. (PDF-Datei; 776 kB)

OSI model

de:OSI-Modell#Schicht 3 – Vermittlungsschicht